Women in Red is a WikiProject addressing the current gender bias in Wikipedia content.
The project focuses on creating content regarding women's biographies, women's works, and women's issues.

The project is named after the hyperlinks in existing Wikipedia articles that display in red to indicate that the linked article has yet to be created. Since the inception of Ada Lovelace Day, Wikipedia edit-a-thons have been popular activities. Research at these events often discovered notable women in STEM who did not have Wikipedia pages, therefore a Red link could be created for that person.

History 

Women in Red was conceived by volunteer Wikipedia editor Roger Bamkin in 2015, and volunteer editor Rosie Stephenson-Goodknight joined forces soon thereafter. Bamkin had initially coined a name for the project, "Project XX", but that was quickly scrapped in favor of WikiProject Women in Red.

After the project was up and running, volunteer editor Emily Temple-Wood signed on. Her specialty is adding a new Wikipedia article about a female scientist each time somebody harasses her about her volunteer editing efforts.

At Wikimania 2016, in Esino Lario, Italy, Jimmy Wales, who co-founded Wikipedia in 2001, named Stephenson-Goodknight and Temple-Wood the Wikipedians of the Year, for the prior 12 months, for their effort to fill the gender chasm.

Methods 

Women in Red conducts Wikipedia edit-a-thons in cities around the world, and continuously hosts a virtual one. The all-day in-person edit-a-thons are focused events conducted to train new contributors so that the Wikipedia gender gap can become narrower and include more content on notable women. Another goal is to increase the number of female editors. Though Wikipedia is "the free encyclopedia that anyone can edit", as of 2015 about only 10 percent of editors were women.

The Women in Red participants help to collate 150 work lists of red linked articles to make it easier to find and create the missing articles.

, Women in Red volunteer editors added over 45,000 articles, and the percentage of tallied articles increased marginally to 16.8 percent of English-language biographies (from 15 percent in July 2015).

Awards and honours
 2016, shortlisted, ITU/UN Women's GEM-TECH Award (category: Apply Technology for Women's Empowerment and Digital Inclusion)

See also
 Art+Feminism

References

External links 

 BBC  Viewpoint: How I tackle Wiki gender gap one article at a time  By Rosie Stephenson-Goodknight  Wikipedian of the Year 2016  7 December 2016

Internet properties established in 2015
Wiki communities
Wikipedia
Women's empowerment
Women's history
Women's studies